Moussa Ali Abdoulkader (January 1, 1923 in Djibouti – September 26, 1986 in Paris) was a politician from Djibouti who served in the French National Assembly from 1967-1973 .

References 
 page on the French National Assembly website

1923 births
1986 deaths
People from Djibouti (city)
Djiboutian politicians
Union of Democrats for the Republic politicians
Deputies of the 3rd National Assembly of the French Fifth Republic
Deputies of the 4th National Assembly of the French Fifth Republic